Nicolaes Visscher I (25 January 1618, Amsterdam – buried 11 September 1679, Amsterdam) was a Dutch engraver, cartographer and publisher. He was the son of Claes Janszoon Visscher.  His son, Nicolaes Visscher II (1649–1702), also worked with him and continued the family tradition of mapmaking after his death. Visscher died in Amsterdam in 1679 and was buried in the Nieuwezijds Kapel on 11 September of that year, though a death year of 1709 is maintained by some sources.

Works
His engraved double hemisphere map, Orbis Terrarum Nova et Accuratissima Tabula, was created in 1658 in Amsterdam. It also contains smaller northern and southern polar projections. The border is decorated with mythological scenes, one in each corner, drawn by the painter Nicolaes Berchem, showing Zeus, Neptune, Persephone and Demeter. It is an early example of highly decorated Dutch world maps.

Gallery

References

External links

1618 births
1679 deaths
Engravers from Amsterdam
Dutch Golden Age printmakers
17th-century Dutch cartographers